William Kitchin may refer to:

 William Walton Kitchin (1866–1924), Governor of the U.S. state of North Carolina
 Billy Kitchin (William Farrington Kitchin), English rugby league footballer of the 1910s
 William H. Kitchin (1837–1901), U.S. Representative from North Carolina.

See also
 William Kitchen Parker, English physician, zoologist and comparative anatomist